Prodigy (Ritchie Gilmore) is a fictional superhero appearing in American comic books published by Marvel Comics.

Publication history

Prodigy first appeared in Slingers #0  (Sept. 1998), and was created by Joseph Harris and Adam Pollina.

Prodigy was one of the feature characters in the 2011 six-issue limited series Fear Itself: Youth in Revolt.

Prodigy eventually joined the Avengers Initiative.

Fictional character biography
Ritchie Gilmore is a typical jock, captain of his college wrestling team, and one of the most popular guys in school. But Ritchie wants more from life; he wants to be stronger and more powerful. The Black Marvel gives him the Prodigy costume, and the chance to be something better. The costume had been imbued with power: it gives Ritchie superhuman strength, he can leap so far and high that it appears that he is flying, and his cape even allows him to glide. Black Marvel makes Ritchie the leader of his new team, the Slingers. As Prodigy, Ritchie can finally be the person he always wanted to be and finds that he enjoys the life of a superhero. However, he is cold and unfeeling towards his teammates, not even showing concern when Dusk falls to her death, and isn't even shocked when she comes back to life. Prodigy feels that he should not have to help his team, and that they need to learn how to handle things on their own. Once, he leaves the Slingers in a collapsing tunnel, saying that if they are truly heroes, they would be able to survive. He is just as prone to beat his friends as his enemies. When he feels that Ricochet challenges his authority, he attacks him, and is only prevented from seriously injuring him by Hornet's intervention. Hornet also has to blast Prodigy with his laser "stingers" to keep him from killing a gang member. Prodigy learns that Black Marvel had made a deal with a demon called Mephisto to give him his costume, and that the demon had collected his "mentor's" soul as payment. While the other three members of his team go to save Black Marvel, he abandons them. But when Ricochet is confronted with an illusion of his dead mother, Prodigy comes back to snap him out of his trance. Prodigy admits that his heart was filled with hate, and he lets that hatred go, and helps his friends free the Black Marvel's soul. The team disbands, but Prodigy apologizes for his actions before he leaves, and says he needs to check on his grandmother, as she had been missing quite a while.

Civil War
Prodigy returns very drunk standing on a rooftop and openly defies the Superhuman Registration Act during the Civil War storyline. Iron Man soon arrives on the scene along with agents of S.H.I.E.L.D. Prodigy declares Iron Man a traitor and then attacks him. Prodigy is defeated by Iron Man and apprehended by S.H.I.E.L.D. agents. Prodigy succeeds, however, in sending a message to the people of the Marvel Universe.  This is considered the first act of Civil War.  Prodigy is later shown, where he is one of the inmates imprisoned within the Negative Zone Prison Alpha; where he was seen by Peter Parker (during his tour with Iron Man) in regards to the status of those that refused to register.  Prodigy is one of the heroes that is freed from his cell when Hulkling, under the guise of Dr. Hank Pym, opens the cells.  He joins Captain America's side to fight Iron Man.

The Initiative
Prodigy next appears as one of The Initiative's new recruits. One of the stipulations of his release from jail is that he takes responsibility for his drunken actions against Iron Man, then appear to fully support the Initiative. Hank Pym talks to him about his drinking 'problem' which Gilmore denied, yet one of the first things he does is go out and buy beer for the group, although he doesn't allow the under-age Batwing to drink.

Secret Invasion
During the Secret Invasion storyline, Prodigy is one of the many heroes who fight rampaging powered Skrulls in Times Square. After the invasion, Prodigy is placed on a probationary period, rather than being assigned to an Initiative team.

Opposing Osborn
After agreeing to work for Norman Osborn as seen in the Dark Reign storyline, Prodigy is placed on the Heavy Hitters. However, eventually he becomes disillusioned with the reorganization of the Initiative under Osborn, who had placed criminals on Initiative teams and publicly seceded his team from the Initiative. Part of this was team member 'Outback' who was in reality the violent thief 'Boomerang'. Prodigy waits for Osborn's reprisal out in the open, intending for the fight to be caught on camera. Force of Nature attack him, and are soon joined by the U-Foes, Freedom Force, members of the Shadow Initiative, and some members of the Hood's army. Justice offers to help, but Prodigy wants to do this alone. He is then ganged up on by the Initiative members while his teammates Telemetry and Nonstop upload footage of the combat to YouTube. Prodigy was held at Prison 42. Norman Osborn insisted he be treated well so the public will eventually forget about him. After Osborn is removed from power following the Siege of Asgard, Prodigy is released and honored for his resistance against Norman Osborn. He has joined the motivational speaker circuit, but he's also trying to reunite the longtime fractured roster of Slingers.

Fear Itself
During the Fear Itself storyline, he takes an office job. Then, Commander Steve Rogers has him assemble a new incarnation of the Avengers Initiative, to deal with the fear and chaos that was happening. At the end of the story-arc, he gets a promotion, only to find out his "promotion" is storage arrangement.

Avengers Academy
Prodigy later appears amongst the heroes on Jeremy Briggs' side, a millionaire who convinced Prodigy a more independent super-team was best. He worked with Komodo and Hardball, among others. However, Briggs' real plan was to eliminate all powers forever, no matter who he had to kill to do it. Briggs was slain in a later fight.

Powers and abilities
Prodigy's costume is mystically infused with power, giving him vast superhuman strength, speed, and stamina. He can leap incredible distances and when he jumps, it appears that he is flying. His golden costume is completely bulletproof, and can withstand most physical assaults. His cape functions as a hang glider, and enables him to glide on air currents.

Prodigy is also adept in the skills of collegiate wrestling. He himself is the captain of the wrestling team at Empire State University. He often employs these grappling techniques when he fights. Prodigy has used submission moves as well, which may stem from the recent trend of collegiate wrestlers competing in MMA.

In other media

Video games
 Prodigy appears in Spider-Man 2: Enter Electro as an alternate costume. It doubles the damage given and allows the player to jump longer and swing farther.
 Prodigy appears in Marvel: Ultimate Alliance 2, voiced by Robert Tinkler. He appears as a boss for the Pro-Registration side and fights them on the roof tops of New York City.
 Prodigy appears as a downloadable content costume in Spider-Man: Edge of Time.

References

External links
 Prodigy (Ritchie Gilmore) at Marvel.com
 Prodigy (Ritchie Gilmore) at Marvel Wiki
 

Comics characters introduced in 1998
Fictional wrestlers
Marvel Comics martial artists
Marvel Comics superheroes
Marvel Comics characters with superhuman strength